The 1950 Swedish speedway season was the 1950 season of motorcycle speedway in Sweden.

Individual

Individual Championship
The 1950 Swedish Individual Speedway Championship final was held on 20 October, in Stockholm. Helge Brinkeback won the Swedish Championship.

Team

Team Championship
Filbyterna won division 1 and were declared the winners of the Swedish Speedway Team Championship for the second time.

Piraterna won the A division of the newly created second-tier league. Saxarna won the B division and Vetlanda won the C division.

Name changes this season included; SMK Stockholm who became Monarkerna, Smålänningarna who became Dackarna and GEMA who became Kaparna.

Two reserve sides also competed under the names of Gastarna (Kaparna B) and Husarerna (Indianerna).

See also 
 Speedway in Sweden

References

Speedway leagues
Professional sports leagues in Sweden
Swedish
Seasons in Swedish speedway